Clinton Green is a prominent Australian expert and identity in the Australian experimental music scene. Apart from hosting Experimental music events, and producing work himself, he has researched, collected and published important collections of Australian Experimental music.

His work has included extensive research into experimental music, Noise music and experimental composers in Australia, covering a range of musical artists including Percy Grainger and Melbourne Dada Group (Barry Humphries), with a number of articles published and audio compilations of the genre released (under his own Shamefile Music label, since 1999).

References 

Australian record producers
Living people
Year of birth missing (living people)